Koybino is a rural locality (a village) in Almozerskoye Rural Settlement, Vytegorsky District, Vologda Oblast, Russia. The population was 10 as of 2002.

Geography 
Koybino is located 67 km southeast of Vytegra (the district's administrative centre) by road. Mitino is the nearest rural locality.

References 

Rural localities in Vytegorsky District